Družstevník Veľký Horeš is a Slovak association football club located in Veľký Horeš. It currently plays in 3. Liga (East) (3rd level), after winning 2015–16 season in 4. liga East - South.

External links
Official website

References

Football clubs in Slovakia